The Arunachal Pradesh Legislative Assembly is the unicameral state legislature of Arunachal Pradesh state in north-eastern India. The seat of the Legislative Assembly is at Itanagar, the capital of the state. The Legislative Assembly comprises 60 Members of Legislative Assembly directly elected from single-seat constituencies.

History
On 29 December 1969, the Agency Council, an apex advisory body for the governance of the North-East Frontier Agency (present-day Arunachal Pradesh), came into existence, with the Governor of Assam as its chairman. The Agency Council was replaced by the Pradesh Council on 2 October 1972. On 15 August 1975 the Pradesh Council was converted to the Provisional Legislative Assembly. Initially, the Legislative Assembly comprised 33 members, of which, 30 members were directly elected from single-seat constituencies and 3 members were nominated by the Union government. On attainment of the statehood on 20 February 1987, the number was raised to 60.

Designations and present members 
The present assembly is the Tenth Legislative Assembly of Arunachal Pradesh.

Members of Legislative Assembly

See also 

 List of constituencies of Arunachal Pradesh Legislative Assembly
 Government of Arunachal Pradesh
 List of governors of Arunachal Pradesh
 List of chief ministers of Arunachal Pradesh

References

External links
 Arunachal Pradesh Lok Sabha Elections 2019 Results Website

 
State legislatures of India
Politics of Arunachal Pradesh
Unicameral legislatures
Government of Arunachal Pradesh